The 1988–89 South Carolina State Bulldogs basketball team represented South Carolina State University during the 1988–89 NCAA Division I men's basketball season. The Bulldogs, led by head coach Cy Alexander, played their home games at the SHM Memorial Center and were members of the Mid-Eastern Athletic Conference. The team won the MEAC regular season and conference tournament titles, and received an automatic bid to the NCAA Tournament.

The team lost to Duke in the first round of the NCAA tournament, and finished with a record of 25–8 (14–2 MEAC).

Roster

Schedule

|-
!colspan=9| Regular season

|-
!colspan=9| MEAC tournament

|-
!colspan=9| NCAA tournament

References

South Carolina State Bulldogs basketball seasons
South Carolina State
South Carolina State
South Carolina State
South Carolina State